Rajendrasinhji Stadium  is a sports stadium in Pune, Maharashtra. The ground is mainly used for organizing matches of football, cricket and other sports. The stadium has hosted a Ranji Trophy match in 1960 when Maharashtra cricket team played against Saurashtra cricket team. Before this the stadium has hosted non-first-class matches when Inter Services Tournament was played in 1952–3 since then, the ground has not hosted any match.

References

External links 

 cricketarchive
 cricinfo
 Wikimapia

Cricket grounds in Maharashtra
Multi-purpose stadiums in India
Cricket grounds in Pune
Sport in Pune
Sports venues in Pune
Sports venues in Maharashtra
Defunct cricket grounds in India
Sports venues completed in 1952
1952 establishments in Bombay State
1960 disestablishments in India
Cricket in Pune
20th-century architecture in India